Večer means "Evening" or "The Evening" in several Slavic languages. It may refer to:

 Večer (North Macedonia), a Macedonian daily newspaper based in Skopje
 Večer (Slovenia), a Slovenian daily newspaper based in Maribor